State Route 203 (SR 203) is part of Maine's system of numbered state highways, located in Waldo County. It is the only state-numbered highway in Maine entirely locally maintained.

Route description
SR 203 begins at an intersection with SR 131 in Waldo, southwest of the town center at an intersection named Neals Corner. It heads north along Pond Road heading through a wooded area with no houses or other structures only passing under a set of power lines. About  later, the road enters the town of Brooks and the road name changes to Lang Hill Highway. Though the road is still within a mostly wooded area, some farms and houses begin to line the road. It makes some curves towards the east as it passes around Lake Passagassawakeag, the source of the Passagassawakeag River. At Morgan Pitch Road, SR 203 curves to the northwest and will remain in this general heading for the remainder of the route. After crossing Marsh Stream, the highway ends at a Y-intersection with SR 139 west of the center of Brooks.

SR 203 is the only state route in Maine that is designated by the Maine Department of Transportation as a townway for its entire length as opposed to a state highway or a state-aid highway. All maintenance on the road is performed by the respective town in which the road sits.

Junction list

References

External links

 Floodgap Roadgap's RoadsAroundME: Maine State Route 203

203
Transportation in Waldo County, Maine